Marcelo dos Santos Marinho or simply Marcelo (born 2 March 1984 in Mococa), is a Brazilian goalkeeper who currently plays for Penapolense.

Honours
Corinthians
Brazilian Série A: 2005

External links
CBF 
sambafoot 
zerozero.pt 
placar 
Guardian Stats Centre

1984 births
Agremiação Sportiva Arapiraquense players
Association football goalkeepers
Brazilian footballers
Clube Atlético Mineiro players
Esporte Clube Bahia players
Living people
Paysandu Sport Club players
Sport Club Corinthians Paulista players
People from Mococa